Streaky the Supercat is a fictional superhero cat that appears in comic books published by DC Comics. He first appeared in Action Comics #261 (February 1960) and was created by Jerry Siegel and Jim Mooney.

He is Supergirl's pet cat who gained incredible powers through exposure to X-Kryptonite; such as flight, super-strength, super-speed, invulnerability, and enhanced vision abilities. His distinctive mark is a lightning bolt in his fur running along both sides. He is also a member of the Legion of Super-Pets, alongside other super-powered animals such as Krypto (who he accompanies as his sidekick and best friend), Beppo and Comet.

Publication history
Streaky the Supercat first appeared in Action Comics #261 (February 1960) and was created by writer Jerry Siegel and artist Jim Mooney. He was the pet of Supergirl, in her identity as Linda Lee.

Fictional character biography
One of a series of superpowered animals, including Krypto the Superdog, Comet the Super-Horse, and Beppo the Super-Monkey, that was popular in DC's comics of the 1960s, Streaky was Supergirl's pet cat that was given super-powers by an unusual form of kryptonite.

In Action Comics #261 (February 1960), Supergirl was experimenting on a piece of green kryptonite in an attempt to find a way to neutralize its deadly effects. When her experiment failed, she tossed the kryptonite (or "X-Kryptonite", as it became known) out the window. Though her experiment failed, her pet Streaky came across the X-Kryptonite and was exposed to its radiation. As the comics described it: "Due to the unique combination of chemicals in X-Kryptonite, it has given Streaky superpowers!" Streaky's powers consisted of a smaller subset of those of Superman and Supergirl, including flight, super-strength, super-vision, super-speed, heat vision, and human-level or better intelligence.

Streaky made sporadic appearances in comic stories through the 1960s, and even became a member of the Legion of Super-Pets, a group consisting of the aforementioned super-powered animals.

Streaky's last Pre-Crisis appearance was in Adventure Comics #394 (June 1970). When all of Earth's kryptonite was transformed into iron in Superman #233 (January 1971), Streaky's X-Kryptonite power source was eliminated as well, ending his super-career and returning him to the life of a normal domestic cat. In an answer to a reader's letter in Supergirl #2 (January 1973), editor E. Nelson Bridwell confirmed the elimination of X-Kryptonite and that the now-powerless Streaky had gone to live with Linda (Supergirl) Danvers' foster parents in Midvale.

During Grant Morrison's run in Animal Man, an alternate, grey-furred Streaky (which left an orange contrail with the telltale lightning bolt marking) made a brief appearance in issues #23–24 (May–June 1990) as one of the Pre-Crisis characters that were returned to reality by the Psycho-Pirate's Medusa Mask. This alternate Streaky attacked "Overman", an evil parallel universe version of Superman with his heat vision before being hurled out of the asylum. Presumably, this Streaky vanished from existence when the Psycho-Pirate's episode of madness ended, along with his human counterparts.

Various cats inspired by and sometimes named Streaky have made appearances in the Post-Crisis DC Universe, but none so far have acquired superpowers. In Peter David's Supergirl (vol. 4) series, a particular cat named Streaky, identical to the Pre-Crisis version, jumps from a tree as if trying to fly before being saved by Supergirl and returned to its owner, saying the town of Leesburg is not "ready for a flying kitten". The cat appeared in issues #25 (September 1998) and #42 (March 2000). At the 2007 New York Comic Con, when asked if Streaky would be returning, writer Paul Dini said that the "cat’s out of the bag".

In Supergirl (vol. 5) #10 (November 2006), it is revealed Kara has a female pet cat. In issue #14 (April 2007), it is revealed that the cat's name is Streaky because "she doesn't get the concept of the litter box". During the Final Crisis, Streaky is first seen in Supergirl's apartment as Supergirl urges her not to pee in the laundry. After the escape of the Anti-Life Equation, Supergirl takes Streaky to the Fortress of Solitude. Supergirl #38 (April 2009) establishes that, when Supergirl began sharing an apartment with Lana Lang as "Linda Lang", she took Streaky with her. When Supergirl moved to New Krypton, Lana looked after the cat.

Streaky's first appearance Post-New 52 and DC Rebirth was in Super Sons Annual #1. This version has traits of the Pre- and Post-Crisis versions, as Streaky is female but has the powers of the original. Streaky was a member of the Legion of Super-Pets (consisting of Krypto, Titus, Flexi the Plastic-Bird, the Bat-Cow, and Clay Critter), but the group had a falling out when their battle against Dex-Starr, Bud and Lou resulted in Clay Critter's death. Krypto and Titus reunite the group to stop an alien pet thief that has been kidnapping the city's dogs. She is also implied to have a crush on Krypto, despite blaming him for Clay Critter's demise.

Descendant
Streaky has a 30th-century descendant named "Whizzy", who first appeared in Action Comics #287 (April 1962), and was created by Jerry Siegel and Jim Mooney. A lookalike for Streaky, Whizzy is an orange cat with white lightning-bolt markings on either side of his body.

Supergirl first encounters Whizzy, who wears a red cape like his ancestor, when she answers a summons from the Legion of Super-Heroes in the 30th century. After defeating the Positive Man, Supergirl is addressed telepathically by a flying cat she assumes is her pet Streaky. She observes: "You have a 'W' insignia on your cape instead of an 'S'! The engraving on your collar explains everything!" True enough, emblazoned on the cat's collar is the following legend: "Whizzy, descendant of famed supercat Streaky".

The effects of the battle with the Positive Man (defeated by use of a Negative Bird) have caused the Legionnaires to seemingly lose their powers. Supergirl covers for the team, but they betray her. She and Whizzy are tossed into the Phantom Zone.

While in the Zone, Supergirl learns the de-powered Legionnaires are really an invading race of "Chameleon Men". Whizzy assists in their escape from the Zone. The invaders are defeated and the heroes are rescued from their asteroid prison.

Other versions
Streaky appears in Supergirl: Cosmic Adventures in the 8th Grade. He has a cameo in issue #3 (April 2009), but it is in issue #4 (May 2009) that he is given superpowers by being exposed to an electrocuted piece of kryptonite that Supergirl had discarded. He leads Supergirl under her school, where she helps him free her fellow students. Then he takes off into space vowing to return, as he has found something out about Supergirl's teachers. He returns in issue #5 (June 2009) where he saves Supergirl by taking a blast from Belinda Zee's Bizarro vision. He is transformed into a saber-toothed cat. With the second blast of this vision, he reverts to a normal cat. He spends the rest of the series hissing at the bad guys, insinuating his intelligence has remained, but the powers and ability to express himself has gone.
Streaky appears Tiny Titans, in which he attends pet club meetings with Supergirl and the other Super-Pets.
In Superman Family Adventures #2, Streaky encounters Fuzzy the Krypto-Mouse for the first time.
A version of the character appears in Supergirl's Wednesday Comics strip, along with Krypto. The story was written by Jimmy Palmiotti and drawn by Amanda Conner.

In other media

Television

 Streaky appears in series set in the DC Animated Universe (DCAU).
 An animatronic toy of Streaky appears in the Batman: The Animated Series episode "Deep Freeze".
 Streaky proper appears in Superman: The Animated Series as Jonathan and Martha Kent's pet domestic cat.
 Streaky appears in the Justice League episode "Comfort and Joy", in which they spend Christmas with Martian Manhunter after he came to Smallville.
 Streaky appears in Krypto the Superdog, voiced by Brian Drummond. This version is Krypto's owner's next-door neighbor, Andrea, who acquires his powers following a lab accident, during which he is exposed to a duplicator laser's beam after it bounces off Krypto, granting Streaky Krypto's powers and weaknesses. Later in the series, he becomes the first feline member of the Dog Star Patrol.
 An unnamed Kryptonian cat resembling Streaky appears in the Legion of Super Heroes episode "Message in a Bottle" as a native of the shrunken city of Kandor. After Brainiac 5 turns the Kandorian sun from red to yellow, the city's inhabitants receive superpowers.
 Streaky makes a cameo appearance in the Batman: The Brave and the Bold episode "The Rise of Blue Beetle!".
 Streaky appears in the "DC Super-Pets!" segment of DC Nation Shorts, voiced by Debra Wilson.
 Streaky appears in the Justice League Action episode "Unleashed".
 Streaky appears in Supergirl as an ordinary black cat that Supergirl adopted following her arrival on Earth.

Miscellaneous
 Streaky appears in the Krypto the Superdog animated series tie-in comic book.
 Streaky appears in issue #14 of the Super Friends tie-in comic book.
 Streaky appears in Capstone Publishers' DC Super-Pets book Royal Rodent Rescue, written by John Sazaklis and drawn by Art Baltazar.

References

Further reading

External links
 
 Streaky the Supercat at the Grand Comics Database
 Streaky the Supercat at the Internet Movie Database
 Streaky the Supercat at Mike's Amazing World of Comics

Animal superheroes
Characters created by Jerry Siegel
Characters created by Jim Mooney
Comics characters introduced in 1960
Supergirl
Superman characters
DC Comics characters who can move at superhuman speeds
DC Comics characters with superhuman strength
DC Comics superheroes
DC Comics male superheroes
DC Comics animals
Fictional cats
Legion of Super-Pets